Radiant Fountains is a 2010 sculpture by Dennis Oppenheim, installed outside Houston's George Bush Intercontinental Airport, in the U.S. state of Texas.

Description and history
Installed along JFK Boulevard, the work was commissioned by the Houston Arts Alliance. It is made of stainless steel and programmed LED lights. CBC Arts described the sculpture as "a spray of acrylic lights", and Artnet's Brook S. Mason called the work "towering brilliant lighting".

The Museum of Fine Arts, Houston's collection has multiple 2010 drawings by Oppenheim called Radiant Fountain.

Reception
Molly Glentzer of the Houston Chronicle called the sculpture "dazzling" and said the "cluster of splash-inspired towers ... has historically been touchy". Bespoke Concierge magazine's Cynthia Lescalleet said Radiant Fountains is "eye-popping". Tommy Gregory, who serves as public art program curator for the Houston Airport System, has said Radiant Fountains is one of "two of the most visible pieces are marquee permanent works" in the collection. Houstonia Michael has also called Radiant Fountains the airport's most prominent public artwork.

See also
 List of public art in Houston

References

External links

 Radiant Fountains at Dennis Oppenheim Estate

2010 establishments in Texas
2010 sculptures
George Bush Intercontinental Airport
Outdoor sculptures in Houston
Stainless steel sculptures in the United States
Steel sculptures in Texas